Reitz is a surname of German origin. Notable people with the surname include:

 Christopher Reitz (born 1973), German field hockey goalkeeper
 Curtis R. Reitz (born 1930), Algernon Sydney Biddle Professor of Law at the University of Pennsylvania Law School
 Deneys Reitz (1882–1944), South African writer and statesman
 Edgar Reitz (born 1932), German filmmaker
 Erik Reitz (born 1982), ice hockey player
 Francis Reitz (disambiguation), several people
 Gijs Bosch Reitz (1860–1938), Dutch painter
 Hans Walter Reitz (1888–1955), German architect of New Objectivity (architecture)
 Joel Reitz (born 1969), bartender and cofounder of O’Reillys Irish Bar and Pub
 Heinie Reitz (1867–1914), American baseball player
 Heinrich Reitz, German rugby union international
 Joe Reitz (born 1985), National Football League player for the Indianapolis Colts
 J. Wayne Reitz (1908–1993), fifth president of the University of Florida (1955–1967)
 Karl Reitz (1887–1943), German musician, also refer to Busch Quartet and August Heinrich Bruinier 
 Ken Reitz (1951–2021), Major League Baseball player

German-language surnames